Sugar Hill Records was an American record label specializing in hip hop music that was founded in 1979 by husband and wife Joe and Sylvia Robinson with Milton Malden and funding from Tony Riviera and Morris Levy, the owner of Roulette Records.

History
Joe Robinson had parlayed a music publishing company that he established years before in New York into Red Robin, Fury, Fire, Enjoy, All Platinum, Stang, Vibration, and Turbo Records before establishing the Sugar Hill label. Artists included his wife Sylvia Robinson, of Mickey & Sylvia fame (who had success in the 1950s with "Love Is Strange"), The Moments ("Love on a Two Way Street"), Brother to Brother, Shirley and Company ("Shame Shame Shame").

Beginnings
The Sugar Hill label's first record was "Rapper's Delight" (1979) by The Sugarhill Gang, which was also the first top 40 hip hop single. Afterwards Super Wolf, The Sequence, Grandmaster Flash and the Furious Five, Funky Four Plus One, Crash Crew, Treacherous Three, and the West Street Mob, joined the label. R&B group The Positive Force released record from Sugar Hill Records also. Sugar Hill's in-house producer and arranger was Clifton "Jiggs" Chase. The in-house recording engineer was Steve Jerome.

Success
They enjoyed several years of success. Sylvia produced several music videos and a young Spike Lee making his first music video for the song "White Lines" (performed by Melle Mel and the Furious Five).

Sold out
A distribution deal with MCA Records ended up in protracted litigation, and, finally, the label closed down in 1986. In 1995, Rhino Records purchased all the released and unreleased masters owned by the Sugar Hill label, covering the Americas and Japan, with Castle Communications (now known as Sanctuary Records, a division of BMG Rights Management) taking the international rights. In 2002, the company's Sugar Hill Studios (originally called "Sweet Mountain Studios") in Englewood, New Jersey was destroyed by a fire. "Rapper's Delight", "The Message", and many other Sugar Hill hits were recorded there. Master tapes from the All Platinum years, as well as Sugar Hill recordings, were reportedly destroyed in the fire.

Label overviews
Old School Rap – The Sugar Hill Story (To the Beat Y'all) (3-CD, 1993, Sequel Records)
The Best of Sugar Hill Records (1-CD, 1994, Hot Classics)
The Message: The Story of Sugar Hill Records (4-CD, 1994, Castle Music) [UK Only]
The Sugar Hill Records Story (5-CD+12", 1997, Rhino Records) [re-released in 1999 without the 12-inch]
The Best of Sugar Hill Records (1-CD, 1998, Rhino Records) [different compilation than above]

See also
List of record labels
Sugar Hill Records (hip hop label) discography

References

American hip hop record labels
Record labels established in 1979
Record labels disestablished in 1986
Post-disco record labels
New Jersey record labels
Englewood, New Jersey